The House Subcommittee on Early Childhood, Elementary and Secondary Education is a standing subcommittee within the United States House Committee on Education and the Workforce. It was formerly known as the Subcommittee on Education Reform.

The Chair of the subcommittee is Gregorio Sablan of Northern Mariana Islands, and the Ranking Member is Burgess Owens of Utah.

Jurisdiction
From the Official Subcommittee website:"Education from early learning through the high school level, including but not limited to early care and education programs such as the Head Start Act and the Child Care and Development Block Grant Act, special education, and homeless and migrant education; overseas dependent schools; career and technical education; school climate and safety, including alcohol and drug abuse prevention; educational equity, including facilities; educational research and improvement, including the Institute of Education Sciences; and pre-service and in-service teacher professional development, including Title II of the Elementary and Secondary Education Act and Title II of the Higher Education Act"

Members, 118th Congress

Historical membership rosters

115th Congress

116th Congress

117th Congress

References

External links
Subcommittee page

Education Education Reform